The Pride of the Force is a 1933 British comedy film directed by Norman Lee and starring Leslie Fuller, Patrick Aherne, Faith Bennett and Hal Gordon. The plot concerns a farmworker who inadvertently becomes the pride of the Metropolitan Police force.

Produced by British International Pictures as part of a series of vehicles for the music hall star Leslie Fuller, it was shot at the company's Elstree Studios. The film's sets were designed by the art director John Mead. It was trade shown in August 1933 but didn't go on full release until March 1934.

Cast
 Leslie Fuller as Bill / Bob Porter
 Patrick Aherne as Max Heinrich
 Nancy Bates as Sheila
 Faith Bennett as Peggy Ramsbottom
 King Curtis as Steve
 Alf Goddard as Sergeant Brown
 Hal Gordon as Dick Smith
 Frank Perfitt as Inspector Ramsbottom
 Ben Welden as Tony Carlotti

References

Bibliography
 Low, Rachael. Filmmaking in 1930s Britain. George Allen & Unwin, 1985.
 Wood, Linda. British Films, 1927-1939. British Film Institute, 1986.

External links

1933 films
1933 comedy films
Films shot at British International Pictures Studios
Films directed by Norman Lee
British comedy films
British black-and-white films
1930s English-language films
1930s British films